William Sweetzer (born 15 February 1958) is a Canadian former professional soccer player. He began his career in England as a youth player with both Oxford United and Queens Park Rangers, before he became a professional with Brentford – although he never made a league appearance. He later played non-league football with Bracknell Town, before playing in the NASL for the Tampa Bay Rowdies in 1981. His brothers Gordon and Jimmy also played professional soccer.

References

1958 births
Living people
Canadian soccer players
North American Soccer League (1968–1984) players
Bracknell Town F.C. players
Tampa Bay Rowdies (1975–1993) players
Soccer players from Toronto
Association football defenders
Canadian expatriate soccer players
Canadian expatriate sportspeople in England
Association football midfielders